Christopher Schwinden (born September 22, 1986) is an American former professional baseball pitcher. He played in parts of two Major League seasons with the New York Mets.

Professional career
Schwinden was drafted by the Detroit Tigers in the 43rd round of the 2004 Major League Baseball Draft out of Golden West High School in Visalia, California, however he did not sign and attended and played baseball at Lewis–Clark State College (Idaho) in 2007; he then attended Fresno Pacific University in 2008.

New York Mets
He was then drafted by the New York Mets in the 22nd round of the 2008 Major League Baseball Draft.

He was called up to the majors for the first time on September 5, 2011 after a stellar season for the Triple-A Buffalo Bisons. Schwinden began the season with the Double-A Binghamton Mets but made the most of a spot start on April 17 to secure a spot in the Triple-A rotation. From there, he led the Bisons in starts (26), innings pitched (145.2), ERA (3.95) and strikeouts (134) while tying for the team lead with eight wins and being named to the Triple-A All-Star team. Schwinden's 134 strikeouts were the third-most in a single season by a Bisons pitcher in the modern era.

On April 26, 2012, Schwinden was recalled to the New York Mets to replace Robert Carson on the roster and Mike Pelfrey in the rotation. Schwinden had gone 2–2 with a 2.05 ERA and a complete game in 4 starts with Buffalo.

Toronto Blue Jays
On June 2, 2012, Schwinden was selected off waivers by the Toronto Blue Jays from the New York Mets. He was assigned to Triple-A Las Vegas.

Cleveland Indians
On June 6, 2012, Schwinden was claimed off of waivers by the Cleveland Indians. He was immediately assigned to the Triple-A Columbus Clippers of the International League. On June 27, the Indians designated Schwinden for assignment to make room for newly acquired Vinny Rottino.

New York Yankees
On June 29, 2012, Schwinden was claimed off waivers by the New York Yankees and was optioned to Triple-A Scranton. He was designated for assignment on July 4 to make room for Darnell McDonald.

Return to Mets
Schwinden was claimed by the New York Mets on July 5, but, on July 10, he was outrighted off the 40-man roster.

Texas Rangers
Schwinden signed a minor league deal with the Texas Rangers on May 17, 2014 and made three starts for the Class AAA Round Rock Express.

Lancaster Barnstormers
Schwinden spent the majority of the 2014 season with the Lancaster Barnstormers of the Atlantic League of Professional Baseball. He was named the Atlantic League Pitcher of the Year after throwing sixteen quality starts and winning nine of his first twelve starts en route to an Atlantic League championship. Schwinden left baseball on a high note as he retired following the 2014 season.

References

External links

1986 births
Living people
New York Mets players
Lewis–Clark State Warriors baseball players
Fresno Pacific Sunbirds baseball players
Brooklyn Cyclones players
Savannah Sand Gnats players
St. Lucie Mets players
Binghamton Mets players
Buffalo Bisons (minor league) players
Scranton/Wilkes-Barre Yankees players
Columbus Clippers players
Las Vegas 51s players
Lancaster Barnstormers players
Major League Baseball pitchers
Baseball players from California
Sportspeople from Visalia, California
Alaska Goldpanners of Fairbanks players